Yablonovsky (or Кощхьабл), informally called Yablonovka, is an urban locality (an urban-type settlement) in Takhtamukaysky District of the Republic of Adygea, Russia, located on the left bank of the Kuban River across Krasnodar in Krasnodar Krai,  northwest of Maykop, the capital of the republic. As of the 2010 Census, its population was 26,171.

Geography
Yablonovsky is connected with Krasnodar in Krasnodar Krai by means of bridges across the Kuban River.

History
In October 2009, President Aslan Tkhakushinov named Yablonovsky the prime candidate for being granted town status due to its being the largest urban locality in Adygea after Maykop and its being larger than Adygeysk, as well as due to its proximity to Krasnodar.

Administrative and municipal status
Within the framework of administrative divisions, the urban-type settlement of Yablonovsky is subordinated to Takhtamukaysky District. As a municipal division, Yablonovsky, together with two rural localities, is incorporated within Takhtamukaysky Municipal District as Yablonovskoye Urban Settlement.

References

Notes

Sources

Urban-type settlements in Adygea